Marcos Antônio Malachias Júnior (born 30 April 1982), commonly known as Marquinhos, is a Brazilian-born Bulgarian retired footballer who played as a midfielder.

Club career
Born in Campinas, Marquinhos started his career at Guaçuano in 2004. In February 2006 he signed with Bulgarian club Belasitsa Petrich from Guaçuano. He made his debut for the club on 4 March 2006 in an A PFG match against Naftex Burgas. Marquinhos made 13 league appearances to the end of the season, scoring five goals, helping the club avoid relegation. In the following 2006–07 season he finished the league campaign with 12 goals in 28 appearances.

On 28 May 2007, Marquinhos moved to CSKA Sofia. The deal was reported to be worth around €150,000. Marquinhos's competitive debut for the club came in CSKA's opening match at away to Litex Lovech on 11 August. On 8 March 2008, Marquinhos scored his first CSKA goal in a 3–1 away win over his previously club Belasitsa.

He scored the equalizing goal in the 1–1 away draw against Derry City on 6 August 2009 to enable his team to progress to the next stage of the UEFA Europa League. He suffered an injury in December 2009, which took him out of play for a couple of months.

On 4 November 2010, Marquinhos scored the winning goal against Rapid Wien in a 2–1 away victory of Europa League group stage. On 25 May 2011, he assisted Spas Delev in a 1–0 win over Slavia Sofia in the final of Bulgarian Cup.

Marquinhos announced retirement on 16 December 2016 after leaving Montana and would start studying in NSA and focus on manager career.

However, in March 2017 he joined the amateur Brazilian club Cascavel. On 9 January 2018 Maquinhos returned again from retirement to play for the Brazilian club Caldense in Campeonato Mineiro.

International career
On 27 May 2011, Marquinhos was named to Bulgaria's squad for the friendly game against Corsica and Euro 2012 qualifier against Montenegro, just days after receiving citizenship from his adopted country. He debuted in an unofficial match against Corsica on 31 May appearing as a substitute for the second half. His official debut came on 4 June against Montenegro; Marquinhos was booked in the 54th minute and the match was drawn 1–1.

Career statistics

Club
As of 15 December 2016

International

Honours

Club
CSKA Sofia
A PFG: 2007–08
Bulgarian Cup: 2010–11
Bulgarian Supercup: 2008

References

External links

1982 births
Living people
Association football midfielders
Brazilian footballers
Bulgarian footballers
Bulgaria international footballers
Bulgarian expatriate footballers
América Futebol Clube (MG) players
PFC Belasitsa Petrich players
PFC CSKA Sofia players
Anorthosis Famagusta F.C. players
Changchun Yatai F.C. players
FC Lokomotiv 1929 Sofia players
OFC Pirin Blagoevgrad players
FC Montana players
First Professional Football League (Bulgaria) players
Chinese Super League players
Cypriot First Division players
Brazilian emigrants to Bulgaria
Naturalised citizens of Bulgaria
Expatriate footballers in Cyprus
Expatriate footballers in China
Sportspeople from Campinas